Daniel Guérin was a male French international table tennis player.

He won a bronze medal at the 1935 World Table Tennis Championships in the men's doubles with Raoul Bedoc. He won another bronze at the 1936 World Table Tennis Championships in the men's team event.

His brother Jean-Claude Guérin was also a table tennis player and their father Dr Charles Guérin was a notable tennis table official and early French champion in fencing.

See also
 List of table tennis players
 List of World Table Tennis Championships medalists

References

French male table tennis players
World Table Tennis Championships medalists
20th-century French people